The Opposite of Hallelujah is an EP by Swedish musician Jens Lekman.

The track "The Opposite of Hallelujah" was listed as the 416th best song of the 2000s by Pitchfork.

Track listing

2005 EPs
Jens Lekman EPs